Tyler Dickerson (born 1993 in Hattiesburg, Mississippi) is an American country music artist signed to Lyric Street Records. He released his debut single, "Tell Your Sister I'm Single," to radio in early 2010.

Biography
Tyler Dickerson was born in Hattiesburg, Mississippi to Steven and Crystal Dickerson. He began performing at an early age, and by eleven he had started performing at venues in Florida. In 2005, he won Florida Male Vocalist and Male Entertainer of the Year awards for his age group. He had also become a regular performer at Tootsie's Orchid Lounge in Nashville, Tennessee.

Dickerson signed to a recording contract with Lyric Street Records in late 2009 after entering a talent search associated with John Rich of Big & Rich, who also mentored him. He released his first single, "Tell Your Sister I'm Single," in February 2010. The song is written by Amanda Williams, Trevor Rosen, and Isaac Rich (brother of John Rich).  Dickerson also signed on as an opening act for Brooks & Dunn's Last Rodeo Tour. Bobby Peacock of Roughstock gave the song a positive review, saying that Dickerson "clearly plays the premise for laughs." "Tell Your Sister I'm Single" debuted at number 51 on the Billboard Hot Country Songs charts dated for the week ending March 13, 2010.

Dickerson now sings in the Louisiana-based band Rockin Rouge.

Dickerson auditioned for The Voice on September 28, 2015. He performed "Hard to Handle," and was chosen by Blake Shelton (the only one who turned his chair) to be on his team. He was eliminated from the show in the top 48, after losing to Zach Seabaugh on a performance of Travis Tritt's "I'm Gonna Be Somebody."

Discography

Singles

References

1993 births
American child singers
American country singer-songwriters
American male singer-songwriters
Living people
Lyric Street Records artists
Singer-songwriters from Mississippi
Musicians from Hattiesburg, Mississippi
Date of birth missing (living people)
The Voice (franchise) contestants
21st-century American singers
Country musicians from Mississippi
21st-century American male singers